The Medicine School of Tunis (FMT) is one of the four medical schools in Tunisia. It is a public institution that belongs to the Tunis El Manar University.

History 
The school was founded in 1964 with only 59 students enrolled. The courses took place in the human and social sciences faculty of Tunis in that year. In 1965, they changed into the University Hospital Charles-Nicolle. Amor Chadli was the first dean of the school.

Location 
The school is located in 15 Djebel Lakhdhar Street La Rabta 1007 in Tunis
.

Deans 
Since its foundation, the Medicine School of Tunis had eight deans.

 1964–1971 : Amor Chadli (anatomo-pathologist)
 1971–1974 : Mongi Ben Hamida (neurologist)
 1974–1976 : Amor Chadli (anatomo-pathologist)
 1976–1977 : Zouhair Essafi (surgeon)
 1977–1986 : Hassouna Ben Ayed (nephrologist and internist)
 1986–1994 : Abdelaziz Ghachem (specialist in medical work and forensic medecine)
 1994–2000 : Chalbi Belkahia (pharmacologist)
 2000–2005 : Rachid Mechmèche (physiologist)
 2005–2011 : Abdeljelil Zaouche (surgeon)
 2011–2017 : Ahmed Maherzi (pediatrician)
 2017–present : Mohamed Jouini (surgeon)

Notable people 
 Habiba Djilani

See also 
 Tunis El Manar University
 Faculty of Medicine of Monastir
 Faculty of Medicine of Sfax
 Faculty of Medicine of Sousse

References

External links 
 

Tunis El Manar University
Public medical universities
Schools in Tunis
Educational institutions established in 1964
1964 establishments in Tunisia
Medical and health organisations based in Tunisia